Märt Avandi (born 26 February 1981) is an Estonian actor and comedian.

Biography
He is known in Estonia for his performances in TV show Tujurikkuja (2008–2015) with Ott Sepp, he got more famous and got more respected in Estonia.

Avandi has worked as an actor in Rakvere Theatre (2004–2006), Endla Theatre (2006–2008; 2015–...) and Estonian Drama Theatre (2009–2014).

He is the chairman and spokesperson for the Estonian Union of Parents with Children with Cancer and organizer of rubber duck races for charity.

Selected filmography

Films

Television

References

External links 

1981 births
Estonian male film actors
Estonian male television actors
Estonian male stage actors
Living people
People from Rapla
21st-century Estonian male actors
Estonian Academy of Music and Theatre alumni
Recipients of the Order of the White Star, 4th Class